Sfafaa is a village and rural commune in Sidi Slimane Province of the Rabat-Salé-Kénitra region of Morocco. At the time of the 2004 census, the commune had a total population of 18,799 people living in 2808 households.

References

Populated places in Sidi Slimane Province
Rural communes of Rabat-Salé-Kénitra